The 1998 NAPA Autocare 500 was the 27th stock car race of the 1998 NASCAR Winston Cup Series season and the 50th iteration of the event. The race was held on Sunday, September 27, 1998, in Martinsville, Virginia at Martinsville Speedway, a  permanent oval-shaped short track. The race took the scheduled 500 laps to complete. Battling immense heat, Rudd Performance Motorsports driver Ricky Rudd would manage to dominate the late stages of the race to take his 20th career NASCAR Winston Cup Series victory and his only victory of the season. To fill out the podium, Hendrick Motorsports driver Jeff Gordon and Roush Racing driver Mark Martin would finish second and third, respectively.

Background 

Martinsville Speedway is an NASCAR-owned stock car racing track located in Henry County, in Ridgeway, Virginia, just to the south of Martinsville. At 0.526 miles (0.847 km) in length, it is the shortest track in the NASCAR Cup Series. The track was also one of the first paved oval tracks in NASCAR, being built in 1947 by H. Clay Earles. It is also the only remaining race track that has been on the NASCAR circuit from its beginning in 1948.

Entry list 

 (R) denotes rookie driver.

Practice

First practice 
The first practice session was held on Friday, September 25, at 11:00 AM EST.

Final practice 
The final practice session, sometimes referred to as Happy Hour, was held on Saturday, September 26, after the preliminary 1998 NAPA 250.

Qualifying 
Qualifying was split into two rounds. The first round was held on Friday, September 25, at 3:00 PM EST. Each driver would have one lap to set a time. During the first round, the top 25 drivers in the round would be guaranteed a starting spot in the race. If a driver was not able to guarantee a spot in the first round, they had the option to scrub their time from the first round and try and run a faster lap time in a second round qualifying run, held on Saturday, September 26, at 11:45 AM EST. As with the first round, each driver would have one lap to set a time. On January 24, 1998, NASCAR would announce that the amount of provisionals given would be increased from last season. Positions 26-36 would be decided on time, while positions 37-43 would be based on provisionals. Six spots are awarded by the use of provisionals based on owner's points. The seventh is awarded to a past champion who has not otherwise qualified for the race. If no past champion needs the provisional, the next team in the owner points will be awarded a provisional.

Four drivers would fail to qualify: David Green, Gary Bradberry, Ken Bouchard, and Randy MacDonald.

Full qualifying results

Race results

References 

1998 NASCAR Winston Cup Series
NASCAR races at Martinsville Speedway
September 1998 sports events in the United States
1998 in sports in Virginia